In 1519, a joint Spanish-Italian attack on Algiers was ordered by Charles V and commanded by Hugo de Moncada. This expedition ended in disaster.

The Viceroy of Sicily Hugo de Moncada was ordered to organise an expedition to conquer Algiers by Charles V. This attack took place in August 1519. A previous Spanish attack had been defeated in 1516 by Oruç Reis, the brother of Hayreddin Barbarossa.

Hayreddin Barbarossa was ready to oppose this expedition with his army. Hayreddin Barbarossa successfully routed the Spanish-Italian attack, resulting in shipwreck and massacre. The leader of the expedition, Hugo de Moncada, managed to escape by hiding among the corpses ashore. 3,036 Spaniards were captured.

When Charles V offered a sum of money for the captured officers, Barbarossa had all of the captives executed. When Barbarossa was offered another sum of money for the return of the dead bodies, he had the bodies thrown into the sea so that “If the relatives of any of the dead came to Algiers, they would not know the burial place of their father or brother, nor be able to see the ashes, but only the waves.” Another expedition against Algiers was led by Hugo de Moncada yet again in 1523. Hayreddin Barbarossa had also captured the Peñón de Vélez de la Gomera in 1522 and severely defeated an attempt to recapture it three years later.

See also
Algiers Expedition (1516)
Algiers expedition (1541)

References

Sources
 

Conflicts in 1519
16th century in Algeria
Battles involving Algeria
Wars involving Algeria
History of Algiers